Miciurin (formerly Ghica-Vodă) is a village in Drochia District, Moldova, named by the Soviets after the anti-genetics propagandist Ivan Vladimirovich Michurin. At the 2004 census, the commune had 1,608 inhabitants.

References

Villages of Drochia District